The Fender Bass VI, originally known as the Fender VI, is a six-string electric bass guitar made by Fender.

Design concept and history
The Fender VI was released in 1961 and followed the concept of the Danelectro six-string bass released in 1956, having six strings tuned E1 to E3, an octave below the Spanish guitar. The Bass VI was closely related to the Fender Jaguar, with which it shared styling and technical details, notably the Fender floating tremolo. The VI had an offset body similar but not identical to that of the Jazzmaster/Jaguar.

It departed from the concept of the Fender Precision Bass in having six strings, a shorter scale and thinner strings, and a mechanical vibrato arm. The Bass VI never caught on to the extent that the four-string Precision Bass and its derivatives did. The model was discontinued in 1975.

Reissue
From 1995 through 1998, Fender Japan produced a vintage reissue featuring the 1963 model's Jaguar-style pickups and electronics.     

The Fender Custom Shop reissued a similar model from 2006 through 2008.  

In 2013, Fender released a Bass VI model as part of its Pawn Shop series. In line with the series' purpose to reconfigure classic Fender designs, this version of the Bass VI has a Jazzmaster-type humbucking bridge pickup and a Stratocaster-style five-position pickup selector, as opposed to separate switches. There are three available colors: brown sunburst with a tortoiseshell pickguard, black with a tortoiseshell pickguard, and candy-apple red with a white pickguard and painted headstock.

Also in 2013, Squier released a Bass VI as part of the Vintage Modified series. This model was similar to the traditional Bass VI design with four switches (on/off for each pickup and a "strangle" (low-cut filter) switch) and a Jaguar-style control plate. It featured a synthetic bone nut, rosewood fingerboard until 2018, medium jumbo frets, chrome hardware, alnico custom single-coil Jaguar pickups with claw, and continued the trend set by the Squier Vintage Modified Jaguars and Jazzmasters of having a non-locking tremolo plate. It was available in three-color sunburst finish with 4-ply tortoiseshell pickguard, Olympic White with a brown tortoiseshell pickguard, and black with a white three-ply pickguard.

In 2019, Squier released its Classic Vibe Bass VI, available in three-color sunburst and black, both with tortoiseshell pickguard. It has a slightly wider width at the nut than the Vintage Modified Bass VI (1.685" vs. 1.65"). The nut was upgraded to bone and the Indian laurel fretboard is equipped with narrow, tall frets. The pickup specs were changed to Fender-designed alnico single-coil pickups while retaining classic Jaguar claw shielding rings and the hardware was switched to nickel. The logo was also changed, from black to gold with black outline. Most of the other remaining features are similar to the Vintage Modified model.

Specifications

Like other Fenders of the time, the Fender VI had a 7.25-inch fingerboard radius. The Fender VI, along with the Jaguar, the Jazzmaster and the Electric XII, was given a cream/white-bound fretboard with rectangular pearloid block inlays in 1967, followed by a thicker black CBS-style headstock decal and polyester finishes instead of nitrocellulose lacquer in 1968. In 1970, as with the other Fender basses in production at the time (excluding the Precision Bass), the Bass VI was also offered with a black-bound Maple neck with black rectangular block inlays.
 Solid body (alder) fretted electric bass guitar, six strings in six courses tuned E-A-D-G-B-E an octave below the standard guitar tuning.
 Scale length 30" / 762 mm (as opposed to 34" / 864 mm for the Jazz and Precision basses) for the U.S. versions, 30.3" for the Japanese versions.
 Curved fingerboard (rosewood), radius 7.25" / 184 mm, 21 frets
 Standard strings .095 .075 .055 .045 .035 .025 inches, Fender stainless steel, P/N 073-5350-000.
 Fender floating bridge and Fender Jaguar/Jazzmaster-style tremolo arm.
 (1961–1975 and in select reissues) Fender Mute

Electronics
The original-issue Bass VI had three Jaguar-style single coil pickups (with the Magnetic Field Accumulators used on the Jaguar guitar-pickups), controlled by a panel of four slider switches (rather than the conventional three-position switch): three individual pickup on/off switches, plus the Jaguar-type 'low-frequency-attenuating' (high-pass) filter.

When the Fender Jaguar was released in 1962, it used the Jazzmaster body with its unusual lead/rhythm electrics and the floating tremolo, but with a short scale-length neck, the Bass VI switch panel and two unique "toothed" pickups. Having only two pickups to control, the Jaguar's third slider switch served as a bass cut (also known as "strangle") switch.

In 1963, the Bass VI electronics were revised to incorporate some features from the Jaguar, with the adoption of toothed pickups and the addition of a fourth slider switch to provide bass-cut. This remained the setup of the Bass VI throughout its remaining 12 years of continuous production.

Electronics mentioned above were all passive electronics.
 Three pickup on/off slider switches.
 Tone control slider switch (bass cut-off, or "strangle") (not on very early models).
 Volume control potentiometer.
 Tone control (treble cut-off) potentiometer.

Vibrato arm
The vibrato tailpiece was the floating type with a locking device. This mechanism was developed for the Fender Jazzmaster and also used on the Fender Jaguar. Engineered to mimic the function of the Bigsby vibrato-tailpiece, it was more elaborate than the synchronized tremolo of the earlier Fender Stratocaster, and was claimed by Fender to be superior, but it failed to achieve the same popularity. It disappeared from the Fender catalogue with the withdrawal of the Jaguar line in the 1970s. It has since reappeared with the reissue of the Jazzmaster model, and is used on some other Fender reissues.  Other 'boutique' builders have begun adopting the aftermarket 'Mastery' version of this unit, and its popularity has increased dramatically in the decade since 2010.

Related instruments
In 2004, Fender issued the Fender Jaguar Baritone Custom (later renamed "Jaguar Bass VI Custom"), which in format was a combination of the Bass VI and the Fender Jaguar. The Jaguar Baritone Custom used the same string gauges and tuning as the Bass VI, but differed in that it has a Jaguar-shaped body, two pickups with Jaguar-style switching options, a fixed bridge and a shorter 28.5-inch scale length.

Ibanez made the SRC-6 Crossover in 2014.

Schecter made several variations of the Ultracure VI, a Robert Smith signature model based on the Bass VI.

Reviews
Brian Molko and Stefan Olsdal of Placebo play Fender Bass VIs, with Molko saying, "Playing the Fender VI is like playing two instruments in one, it can be treated as a guitar and as a bass."

Producer Mike McCarthy talked about using the Fender Bass VI on records in a December 2007 Mix magazine article.

Notable users and appearances
 John Paul Jones (Led Zeppelin) 
 Klaus Flouride (Dead Kennedys)
 Hank the Knife & the Jets
 Joe Perry – Aerosmith ("Back in the Saddle")
 Graham Coxon (The End of the F***ing World soundtrack)
 Duff McKagan – Guns N' Roses: Use Your Illusion I and II ("Right Next Door To Hell," "14 Years", "Yesterdays")
 Mark Hoppus on select tracks of Blink-182's self-titled album and on 2003 performances of "I Miss You".
 Robert Smith, Porl Thompson, Perry Bamonte, Simon Gallup, Reeves Gabrels (The Cure)
 John Frusciante – ("Dark/Light"), on his album The Empyrean.
 Brian Molko, Stefan Olsdal (Placebo)
 Rick Danko (The Band)
 Robbie Robertson (The Hawks)
 Jack Bruce - Cream (early years, later switched to Gibson EB-3).
 Glen Campbell
 Ted Nugent – Select tracks throughout his solo career, including "Sunrize" on 2018's The Music Made Me Do It.
 John Entwistle (The Who)
 George Harrison and John Lennon (The Beatles) on tracks where bassist Paul McCartney plays either piano or guitar; namely throughout The White Album, Abbey Road and Let It Be.
 Eric Haydock (The Hollies)
 James Mankey - During his tenure in Sparks as their bassist.
 Robin Guthrie, Simon Raymonde (Cocteau Twins)
 Steve Kilbey (The Church)
 Sergio Vega (Deftones, Quicksand)
 Wes Montgomery on his LP Movin' Along.
 Doug McCombs (Tortoise)
 Roy Babbington (Soft Machine)
 Jet Harris (Through his career with Tony Meehan)
 Nigel Tufnel (played by Christopher Guest), in the film This Is Spinal Tap, owns a Fender Bass VI which he refuses to play, or even allow others to look at.
 Peter Green (Fleetwood Mac) - For example, live version of "Green Manalishi" on Live In Boston.
 Conor Deegan (Fontaines D.C.) — seen in the video for "Jackie Down The Line".

Literature

References

External links
 Fender – Manufacturer's official site.
 bassvi.org – The Fender Bass VI Forum

Bass VI
1961 musical instruments
Musical instruments invented in the 1960s
The Beatles' musical instruments